The Raid on Khataba, also referred to as the raid on Gardez, was an incident in the War in Afghanistan in which five civilians, including two pregnant women and a teenage girl, were killed by U.S. forces on February 12, 2010. All were shot when U.S. Army Rangers raided a house in Khataba village, outside the city of Gardez, where dozens of people had gathered earlier at the home to celebrate the naming of a newborn baby. Initially, U.S. Military officials implied the three women were killed before the raid by family members, reporting that the women had been found "tied up, gagged and killed." But investigators sent by the Afghan government reported, based on interviews and pictures of the scene, that the special operation forces removed bullets from the victims' bodies and cleaned their wounds as part of an attempted coverup. NATO denied this allegation, and Afghan investigator Merza Mohammed Yarmand stated, "We can not confirm it as we had not been able to autopsy the bodies." The US military later admitted that the special operations unit killed the three women during the raid.

Response
NATO and the UN claimed to "not know of such an incident", but press leakage led to a full investigation of the killings, but the bodies of the deceased were buried according to religious tradition before NATO could conduct autopsies to confirm the allegations. Insisting that the deaths were a "terrible mistake" Vice Admiral William McRaven, head of the JSOC, the command over the unit which conducted the raid, visited Khataba two months after the raid. He apologized, accepted responsibility for the deaths, and made a traditional Afghan condolence offering of sheep. The soldiers that had conducted the raid faced no disciplinary measures since they had followed the "rules of engagement".

In media
 Dirty Wars, a 2013 American documentary by Jeremy Scahill.

References

External links

Images US special forces 'tried to cover-up' botched Khataba raid in Afghanistan

Massacres in Afghanistan
2010 in Afghanistan
United States military scandals
History of Paktia Province
Massacres committed by the United States
War in Afghanistan (2001–2021) casualties
Civilian casualties in the War in Afghanistan (2001–2021)
February 2010 events in Afghanistan